The 1874 Atlantic hurricane season was a relatively inactive one, in which seven tropical cyclones developed. Four storms intensified into hurricanes, but none attained major hurricane (Category 3+) status. However, in the absence of modern satellite and other remote-sensing technologies, only storms that affected populated land areas or encountered ships at sea were recorded, so the actual total could be higher. An undercount bias of zero to six tropical cyclones per year between 1851 and 1885 and zero to four per year between 1886 and 1910 has been estimated.

The first storm of the season developed on July 2, and the final storm was last sighted on November 4, while situated just to the north of the Bahamas.
Most of the systems directly impacted land. A tropical storm that developed in the Bay of Campeche during the month of September destroyed the Brazos Santiago lighthouse. in the state of Texas. The sixth storm of the season, and also the third hurricane, made landfall in Florida as a Category 1 hurricane before making a second landfall in South Carolina at the same intensity. The seventh, final, and strongest system of the season developed in the Caribbean on the last day of October, and made landfall in Jamaica as a Category 2 hurricane before weakening to a tropical storm by the time it made a second landfall in Eastern Cuba. The storm was last sighted to the north of the Bahamas on November 4, as a Category 1 hurricane.

Season summary 
The Atlantic hurricane database (HURDAT) officially recognizes seven tropical cyclones from the 1874 season. The first storm of the season was a tropical storm that formed in the Gulf of Mexico during the month of July. The system made landfall near Galveston, Texas on July 5, although it is unknown whether any damages or fatalities were caused as a result of the storm. The second and third systems of the season were both hurricanes, with winds up to  respectively. The first system made landfall in Newfoundland as a tropical storm. The fifth storm of the season formed northeast of the Bahamas on September 8, and moved northward before turning to the north-northeast. It was last sighted to the south of Newfoundland on September 11. The next system developed in the western Caribbean on the last day of October, before crossing over the Yucatan Peninsula and making landfall in Florida as a Category 1 hurricane. The storm briefly weakened to a tropical storm over the state before restrengthening into a hurricane off the coast of Georgia. It made a second landfall in South Carolina on September 28, and became extratropical on September 30, while moving across the northeast. This was the first hurricane to ever be shown on a weather map. The seventh, and final, hurricane of the season was also the most intense of the year. It developed several hundred miles north of Panama on the last day of October, before striking Jamaica as a Category 2 hurricane. It weakened to a tropical storm before making landfall in Eastern Cuba, but later strengthened into a hurricane again while north of the Bahamas, where it was last sighted on November 4.

Timeline

Systems

Tropical Storm One 

On July 2, a tropical storm reportedly developed in the Gulf of Mexico, while located a couple of hundred miles to the south of the Florida Panhandle. Holding steady in strength, the tropical storm made landfall near Galveston, Texas on July 5, and then rapidly dissipated shortly after moving inland that same day. In Indianola, Texas, the storm blew down fledgling settlements and sank ships, seriously hindering coastal trade.

Hurricane Two 

On August 3, a tropical storm developed in the open Atlantic, several hundred miles from any landmasses. Slowly gaining strength, the system reached hurricane status and a peak intensity of  while located just northeast of the island of Bermuda on August 5. It dissipated shortly afterwards.

Hurricane Three 

On August 29, a tropical storm developed a few hundred miles to the west of the Cape Verde Islands. Moving towards the west-northwest, the storm steadily gained strength, and reached hurricane strength at 0000 UTC September 2 (8 p.m. AST September 1). Moving just to the west of Bermuda, the storm began to turn more northerly, and transitioned into an extratropical system the following day. On September 8, the storm made landfall in Newfoundland as an extratropical storm.

Tropical Storm Four 

On September 2, a tropical storm developed in the Bay of Campeche. Shortly thereafter, the storm made landfall and quickly weakened into a tropical depression. Moving northward through Central Texas, the storm dissipated on September 7, while located to the southwest of the Dallas-Fort Worth, Texas area. The storm was responsible for destroying the Brazos Santiago lighthouse and for one fatality.

Tropical Storm Five 

On September 8, a tropical storm was observed to the northeast of the Bahamas. Turning towards the northeast, it was last observed to the south of Newfoundland on September 11.

Hurricane Six 

On September 25, a tropical storm developed in the western Caribbean, north of Honduras. Upon making landfall on the Yucatan Peninsula shortly afterwards, the storm briefly weakened into a tropical depression. However, when it emerged into the Gulf of Mexico, it attained tropical storm status once again. Steadily gaining strength, the storm reached hurricane status on September 28, after reports from the ship "Emma D. Finney" indicated such. The storm was briefly downgraded into a tropical storm over the central portion of the state, but strengthened into a hurricane again after exiting near Jacksonville, Florida and crossing the Gulf Stream. It hit South Carolina as a hurricane that same day, with the centre passing just east of Charleston and west of Wilmington. In North Carolina, Virginia, and several other states to the north, there were reports of trees being brought down, and shipping disrupted. At Smithville(Southport) several houses, warehouses, telegraph lines and railroad bridges were destroyed. The storm lost hurricane status for a final time over eastern North Carolina. Moving on a north-northeast track, it moved into the northeast United States and transitioned into an extratropical cyclone on September 30, while over the state of Maine. On October 1, it dissipated over eastern Canada.

This was also the first hurricane ever to be recorded on a weather map by the U.S. Weather Bureau.

Hurricane Seven 

On October 31, a tropical storm developed to the north of Panama. Moving towards the east-northeast, the storm attained hurricane status on November 1, while situated just south of Jamaica. Upon making landfall in the island nation on November 2, the storm strengthened into a Category 2 hurricane with  winds, becoming the strongest system of the 1874 season. Reports from Kingston, Jamaica spoke of 17 vessels being wrecked or destroyed by the storm. After crossing Jamaica, the system weakened into a Category 1 hurricane and then further into a tropical storm upon making landfall in eastern Cuba. On November 3, the system emerged in the Bahamas, and strengthened into a hurricane once again the following day. On November 4, the storm was last sighted to the northeast of the Bahamas.

See also 

 Atlantic hurricane season
 List of Newfoundland hurricanes
 Tropical cyclone observation
 Atlantic hurricane reanalysis project

References

External links 

 Monthly Weather Review
 HURDAT Data for the 1874 Atlantic hurricane season

 
Atlantic hurricane seasons
Articles which contain graphical timelines
Atlantic
Atlantic